Eric Gansworth is a Haudenosaunee novelist, poet and visual artist.

Early life
Gansworth was born in 1965 and is an enrolled citizen of the Onondaga Nation; however, he grew up in the Tuscarora Nation as a descendant of one of two Onondaga women present among the Tuscarora at the foundation of the nation in the 18th century. Gansworth originally qualified in electroencephalography, considered a profession useful to his nation; however, he went on to study literature and to continue a lifelong interest in painting and drawing.

Work
Gansworth has written five novels, including the award-winning Mending Skins (2005) and Extra Indians (2010). In all his novels, illustrations form an integral part of the reading experience. His critically acclaimed first young adult novel, If I Ever Get out of Here, deals with the friendship between two boys, one a resident of the Tuscarora Nation, the other living on the nearby Air Force base. In a starred review, Booklist stated that the book succeeded in "sidestepping stereotypes to offer two genuine characters navigating the unlikely intersection of two fully realized worlds."

Gansworth states that growing up he was struck by an absence of images of contemporary Native American life to use as drawing practice, noting that "I could offer images from the Planet of the Apes, The Towering Inferno, Spiderman and, of course, Batman, but I had a critical shortage of Indian drawings." Subsequently, in his literary studies he was again critical of the lack of American Indian authored texts offered on his courses. Much of his current literary and artistic drive can be seen as attempting to overcome this lack of attention. Gansworth himself sees the two themes most important to his work as being "the ways history informs the present" and also a strong interest in entertainment culture.

Critic Susan Bernardin has analyzed Gansworth's writing via Gerald Vizenor's concept of survivance, suggesting that his novel Mending Skins "suggests how Native peoples reimagine patterns of loss into new stories, especially through humored stories of survivance."

His 2020 non-fiction book, Apple (Skin to the Core) won a Michael L. Printz honor for best young adult writing.

Visual arts
Gansworth's art career began with "trying to hawk my drawings to the folks who lived down the road"; his professional career, however, began with the exhibition Nickel Eclipse: Iroquois Moon in 1999. Since then, he has exhibited regularly. One of his images was chosen for the cover of Sherman Alexie's novel First Indian on the Moon.

Bibliography

Novels

Young adult
 
 
Apple (Skin to the Core). Arthur A. Levine Books. 2020.

Poetry

Edited anthology

See also
List of writers from peoples indigenous to the Americas
List of Native American artists
Visual arts by indigenous peoples of the Americas

References

External links
Discussion of If I Ever Get Out Of Here by Debbie Reese for the blog American Indians in Children's Literature''
Video interview conducted at SUNY New York.
Official website
Extended bibliography and work online

1965 births
20th-century American male writers
20th-century American novelists
21st-century American male writers
21st-century American novelists
American Book Award winners
American male novelists
Living people
Native American novelists
Onondaga people
Tuscarora people